Antelope Lake is a lake in South Dakota, in the United States. 
 
Antelope Lake was named for the frequent antelope near it in early days.

See also
List of lakes in South Dakota

References

Lakes of South Dakota
Lakes of Clark County, South Dakota